The Barnes' garden eel (Gorgasia barnesi) is an eel in the family Congridae (conger/garden eels). It was described by Bruce H. Robison and Thomas M. Lancraft in 1984. It is a marine, tropical eel which is known from the western Pacific Ocean, including Indonesia, the Philippines, Vanuatu, the Solomon Islands and Papua New Guinea.

Etymology
The species epithet "barnesi" refers to Anthony T. Barnes.

References

External links
 

Gorgasia
Taxa named by Bruce H. Robison
Taxa named by Thomas M. Lancraft
Fish described in 1984